Rasos is an eldership in the Vilnius City Municipality, Lithuania. It occupies 16.3 km². According to the 2011 census, it has a population of 10,597.

Sports

Liepkalnis area 
Liepkalnis Winter Sports Centre
LFF Stadium

References

Neighbourhoods of Vilnius
Ski areas and resorts in Lithuania